was a Japanese media executive. He founded and served as the first President of Japan Cable Television, and as a Vice President of Asahi Broadcasting Company (now TV Asahi).

Biography
The eldest son of Japanese foreign minister Yōsuke Matsuoka, Kenichiro was born in the United States while his father was First Secretary of the Embassy of Japan, Washington, D.C., and attended the Tokyo Imperial University, majoring in Political Science. 

When his father took over leadership of the South Manchuria Railway (Mantetsu), Kenichiro became involved with the Manchukuo Film Association (Man'ei), formed in partnership with Mantetsu. Through Man'ei, Kenichiro would meet Negishi Kanichi and Masahiko Amakasu, who gave him experience in building a film studio from the ground up. Kenichiro would also meet the popular pre-war Japanese actress Yoshiko Yamaguchi, whom Yamaguchi would write in her biography "Ri Kōran: My Half Life", to be her first love. They would meet again after the war, at which time Kenichiro attempted to rekindle the relationship, but by then, Yamaguchi was already involved with the noted designer Isamu Noguchi.

Returning to Japan in 1940, there was talk of Kenichiro attending school in America to defuse any suspicion of Japan's war ambitions, and he would join the state run news agency Dōmei Tsushin that would be broken up by Allied forces during the Occupation of Japan. Matsuoka followed Yōnosuke Natori to the Sun News Photo agency following Dōmei's breakup, then go on to join the fledgling Nippon Educational Television Board (NET) television network upon its founding in 1957.

NET courted Matsuoka for his knowledge of foreign culture and fluency in English and French, having been born in the United States, studied in Paris, and experienced with Mantetsu. He was able to watch foreign programming in its original format and was responsible for licensing Rawhide and Laramie, gaining high ratings for the new network, and giving them an advantage over rivals NHK and Fuji TV.

By the time NET parent company Asahi Shimbun would rebrand the network as Asahi Broadcasting Corporation in 1977, Matsuoka would be promoted to Executive Vice President (Fuku-shacho) at Asahi Broadcasting Co, serve as a founder of Japan Cable Television, and act as its first president, a position he held until his retirement in 1986.

Legacy
Kenichiro was portrayed in the film Ri Kōran by Fukami Motoki.

Family
Kenichiro's father Yōsuke, was a prominent diplomat in pre-war Japan. Kenichiro's mother Ryuko, was the daughter of an influential kuge judge Shin Soroku, a former retainer of the Chōshū clan, and a beneficiary of their outsized influence in the Meiji Restoration that helped shaped the modern Japanese Government. Yōsuke's sister Fujie was widowed in 1911 with two young girls, whom Yosuke supported as if his own. One of those nieces, Hiroko, married future Japanese Prime Minister Eisaku Satō, and ties Kenichiro to the Japanese Prime Minister Shinzo Abe and the Abe political dynasty through Abe's maternal grandfather, Nobusuke Kishi, Eisaku's older brother.

References
Wikipedia Japan article on Kenichiro Matsuoka - (:jp:松岡謙一郎)

1914 births
1994 deaths
Television executives
20th-century Japanese businesspeople
Japanese business executives